Runeberg may refer to:

 Runeberg Prize, a Finnish literary award named after the poet Johan Ludvig Runeberg
 MS J. L. Runeberg, a cruise ship named after Johan Ludvig Runeberg
 Project Runeberg, a digital cultural archive initiative for Nordic countries
 Johan Ludvig Runeberg (1804–1877), Finland-Swedish priest and poet
 Walter Runeberg (1838–1920), Finnish sculptor

sv:Runeberg